Lieutenant General Sir John Richard Alexander MacMillan  (born 8 February 1932) is a Scottish officer in the British Army who served as General Officer Commanding Scotland. While he was at university, he was a rower and represented Great Britain at the 1952 Summer Olympics.

Early life and education

MacMillan was born in London to General Sir Gordon MacMillan and Marion Blakiston-Houston. He attended Eton College and Trinity College, Cambridge.

Rowing
While at Trinity College, MacMillan was a member of the Cambridge University Boat Club. He competed in the men's double sculls event at the 1952 Summer Olympics, with Peter Brandt as his rowing partner. They were eliminated in the first repechage.

MacMillan competed in The Boat Race 1953, a side-by-side rowing race in eights between crews from the universities of Oxford and Cambridge along the River Thames. Cambridge won by eight lengths.

Military career
MacMillan was commissioned into the Argyll and Sutherland Highlanders in 1953.

He was appointed Commanding Officer of 1st Battalion the Gordon Highlanders in 1971 and Commander of 39th Infantry Brigade, a unit permanently stationed in Northern Ireland, in 1977. He was given the colonelcy of the Gordon Highlanders from 1978 to 1986.

He became General Officer Commanding Eastern District in 1982, Assistant Chief of the General Staff in 1984 and General Officer Commanding Scotland and Governor of Edinburgh Castle in 1988. He retired in 1991.

In 1995, he became Chairman of the Erskine Hospital in Renfrewshire.

Honours
On 19 February 1973, MacMillan was appointed an Additional Officer of the Military Division of the Order of the British Empire (OBE). This was for "distinguished services in Northern Ireland during the period 1 May to 31 July 1972"; during that time, Bloody Friday and Operation Motorman happened. On 12 December 1978, MacMillan was promoted to Additional Commander of the Military Division of the Order of the British Empire (CBE). This was "in recognition of distinguished service in Northern Ireland during the period 1 May to 31 July 1978.

In the 1988 Birthday Honours, MacMillan was appointed Knight Commander of the Order of the Bath (KCB).

Family
In 1964, MacMillan married Belinda Webb, daughter of Lt-Col Richard Henry Lumley Webb. They have one son and two daughters.

References

External links
 

 

|-

|-
 

1932 births
Living people
People educated at Eton College
Alumni of Trinity College, Cambridge
Argyll and Sutherland Highlanders officers
Knights Commander of the Order of the Bath
Commanders of the Order of the British Empire
British Army lieutenant generals
Gordon Highlanders officers
Military personnel from London
People from Westminster
British male rowers
Olympic rowers of Great Britain
Rowers at the 1952 Summer Olympics